Thomas Llewellyn Jones ( 8 March 1872 – 18 June 1946) was a company director and member of both the Queensland Legislative Council and Queensland Legislative Assembly.

Early life
Jones was born at Welshpool, Montgomeryshire, Wales, to John Jones his wife Elizabeth (née Llewellyn). He came to Queensland at a young age and attended Brisbane Normal and Brisbane Grammar schools.

Political career
Jones, representing the Labor, won the state seat of Oxley at the 1915 Queensland election, defeating the then Premier of Queensland, Digby Denham. He held the seat for one term before losing to Cecil Elphinstone in 1918.

When the Labour Party starting forming governments in Queensland, it found much of its legislation being blocked by a hostile Council, where members had been appointed for life by successive conservative governments. After a failed referendum in May 1917, Premier Ryan tried a new tactic, and later that year advised the Governor, Sir Hamilton John Goold-Adams, to appoint thirteen new members whose allegiance lay with Labour to the Council.

In August 1919, Jones was one of three additional new members, and went on to serve for two and a half years until the Council was abolished in March 1922.

Personal life
Jones was twice married, firstly to Amy Alice Lane in 1901, and together had a son and daughter. Amy died in 1936, and a year later he married Gwendolen Gee (died 1982).

He was the chairman director of Foggitt, Jones & Co., provision merchants and commercial agents, a trustee of the Brisbane Grammar School, a senate member of the Queensland University, chairman of the Brisbane Hospital Board, and Commodore of the Royal Queensland Yacht Squadron.

Jones died in Brisbane in June 1946 and was cremated at Mount Thompson crematorium.

References

Members of the Queensland Legislative Assembly
Members of the Queensland Legislative Council
1872 births
1946 deaths
Australian Labor Party members of the Parliament of Queensland
People from Welshpool